Shri Nivetha Paramanantham is an Indian sport shooter.She won the Gold  in the women’s 10m air pistol team event  in the ISSF Shooting World Cup in Cairo.

References

Living people
1995 births
Indian female sport shooters
ISSF rifle shooters